Semagystia tristis is a moth in the family Cossidae. It was described by Andreas Bang-Haas in 1912. It is found in Turkmenistan (Karagai-tau), the Mongolian Altai, Kazakhstan, Tajikistan, Kirghizistan and Afghanistan.

References

Cossinae
Moths described in 1912